Koko or KOKO may refer to:

Animals
Koko (gorilla) (1971–2018), a gorilla trained to communicate in American Sign Language
Koko (dog) (2005–2012), the Australian kelpie in the 2011 film Red Dog
Koko (horse), an Irish racehorse that won the 1926 Cheltenham Gold Cup
Ko'ko' or Guam rail, a flightless bird

Plants
Central African name for Gnetum africanum, an edible vegetable

Places
Koko, Benin, a town and arrondissement in Benin
Koko, Bouaké, a neighbourhood of Bouaké, Ivory Coast
Koko, Savanes,  a village in Ivory Coast
Koko, Delta, a town in Delta State, Nigeria
Koko, a town in Koko/Besse Local Government Area in Kebbi State, Nigeria
Koko Head, the headland that defines the eastern side of Maunalua Bay along the southeastern side of the Island of Oʻahu in Hawaiʻi
Koko River, Rusizi District, a river in southwestern Rwanda that is a tributary of the Ruhwa River
Koko River, Rutsiro District, a river in the Rutsiro District of western Rwanda that flows into Lake Kivu

People with the name
Koko, is the diminutive of the name Krikor in Armenian

Mononyms
Emperor Kōkō (830–887), 58th emperor of Japan
King Koko or Frederick William Koko Mingi VIII of Nembe (1853–1898), African ruler of the Nembe Kingdom

Given name
Koko Archibong (born 1981), Nigerian-American basketball player
Koko Prasetyo Darkuncoro (born 1981), Indonesian beach volleyball player 
Koko Jones (born 1989), American jazz percussionist
Koko Komégné (born 1950), Cameroonian visual artist
Koko Kondo (born 1944), birth name Koko Tanimoto, a prominent Japanese atomic bomb survivor
Koko Pimentel (born 1964), Filipino politician
Koko Sakibo (born 1987), Nigerian footballer
Koko Stambuk (born 1977), Chilean singer-songwriter and producer
Julio "Koko" Sosa (born 1926), Argentine guitarist
Koko Taylor (1928–2009), R&B singer
Kōko Tsurumi (born 1992), Japanese artistic gymnast
Koko B. Ware (born 1957), American professional wrestler

Middle name
James Koko Lomell (born 1985), Liberian footballer

Surname
Demeter Koko (1891–1929), Austrian graphic artist 
Georgette Koko (born 1953), Gabonese politician
Lolani Koko (born 1963), Samoan rugby football player

Stage name / ring name
Koko B. Ware (born 1957),  American professional wrestler real name James Ware, Koko B. being his ring name

Music
KOKO (music venue), a music venue in London
"Ko-Ko", a 1945 jazz composition by Charlie Parker
"Ko-Ko", a 1940 jazz composition by Duke Ellington
"Koko", a 2005 song by Goldfrapp from Supernature

Radio stations
KOKO (AM), a radio station (1450 AM) licensed to serve Warrensburg, Missouri, United States
KOKO-FM, a radio station (94.3 FM) licensed to serve Kerman, California, United States
KOKO-LP, a radio station (96.3 FM) licensed to serve Hana, Hawaii, United States

Characters
Koko the Clown, a 1919 cartoon character
Koko/Kao K’o Kung, a character in the Cat Who... series by Lilian Jackson Braun
Ko-Ko, a character from The Mikado
Koko, a character in Chuggington
Koko, a character from Zatch Bell!
Koko Hekmatyar, a character from Jormungand
Koko, a character from The LEGO Ninjago Movie

Other uses
Koko (novel), a 1988 novel by Peter Straub
KoKo (computer virus), a memory resident computer virus
Koko: A Red Dog Story, a documentary based on the dog Koko
Kommerzielle Koordinierung, a secret commercial enterprise in East Germany, run by the Stasi officer Alexander Schalck-Golodkowski
Albizia lebbeck or Koko, a species of tree
Gege (title) or Ko-ko, a Manchu title
ǂKxʼauǁʼein languages or Koko
Tapu Koko, a Generation VII Pokémon
Kōkō, short for Kōtōgakkō, meaning a high school. See Secondary education in Japan
Koko (millet porridge), a type of porridge by Hausa people

See also
Coco (disambiguation)
Cocoa (disambiguation)
Koco (born c 1975), lead guitarist of the 2006 Indian rock band Agnee
Koko Guyot, an underwater volcano
Koukou (disambiguation)
Kokos, the diminutive form of the name George in Greek 
Koko, the diminutive form of the name Grigor or Krikor in Armenian